"Pimp Juice" is the fourth US and Canadian single by American rapper Nelly, released on March 10, 2003, from his 2002 album, Nellyville. The song peaked at number 58 on the Billboard Hot 100. It samples UGK's song Wood Wheel from their album Dirty Money. 

In the song, Nelly states that women only want him for his "pimp juice", which he needs to let loose. He later explains that "pimp juice" is anything used to "attract the opposite sex/It could be money, fame, or straight intellect" and that "Pimp juice is color blind/You find it work on all color creeds and kinds". The song was featured in VH1's "50 Most Awesomely Bad Songs...Ever" at number 30.

Controversy
The song received backlash for its apparent glorification of prostitution. In 2004, students at Spelman College, the historically black women's college in Atlanta, protested Nelly's bone-marrow drive—which he had started after discovering his sister had been diagnosed with leukemia.

Remix
The official remix features Ronald Isley of the Isley Brothers and The Feed's David Grelle on keyboard, and the song is on Nelly's remix album, Da Derrty Versions: The Reinvention. It contains a sample of "Curtains" by The Jeff Lorber Fusion.

Track listing
US 12-inch vinyl
A1. "Pimp Juice" (clean album version) – 4:52
A2. "Pimp Juice" (dirty album version) – 4:52
A3. "Pimp Juice" (instrumental) – 4:52
B1. "Pimp Juice" (clean album version) – 4:52
B2. "Pimp Juice" (dirty album version) – 4:52
B3. "Pimp Juice" (instrumental) – 4:52

Charts

See also
 Pimp Juice (drink)

References

Songs about procurers
Songs about prostitutes
2002 songs
2003 singles
Music videos directed by Benny Boom
Nelly songs
Songs written by Nelly
Universal Records singles